Pöcking is a municipality  in the district of Starnberg in Bavaria in Germany. Duchess Elisabeth in Bavaria, consort of Emperor Franz Josef I of Austria-Hungary, grew up here in the Possenhofen Castle as daughter of Duke Max in Bavaria and Princess Ludovika of Bavaria.

Transport
The district has a railway station, that is served by the Munich S-Bahn.

Notable people
Archduchess Adelheid of Austria
Princess Alexandrine of Prussia (1915–1980)
Otto von Habsburg, Crown Prince of Austria-Hungary lived and died here
Leni Riefenstahl lived and died here

References

Starnberg (district)